The Syria Davis Cup team represents Syria in Davis Cup tennis competition and are governed by the Syrian Arab Tennis Federation. Syria currently competes in the Asia/Oceania Zone of Group IV.

History
Syria made their Davis Cup debut in 1986. Their best performance is reaching the Asia/Oceania Zone Group II second round in 1988.

Syria currently compete in the Asia/Oceania Zone of Group III.  They won Group III in 2000, 2010 and 2013.

Current team (2022) 

 Rabee Sleem
 Yacoub Makzoume
 Madji Salim

Statistics

The youngest player in Syrian Davis Cup history was Rabi Bouhassoun, aged 15 years and 212 days.

The oldest player in Syrian Davis Cup history was Jehad Sheet, aged 41 years and 159 days.

The longest rubber in Syrian Davis Cup history was 4 hours and 22 minutes, when on 9 February 2001 Selvam Veerasingam of Malaysia defeated Syria's Rabi Bouhassoun 7-6 6-7 7-6 7-6

The longest final set of a rubber, in Syrian Davis Cup history, took place on 9 April 1988 when Hassan Bin Bohari and Albert Teo of Singapore defeated Abdul-Latif Mourad and Samer Mourad of Syria 16-14 in the third and final set of the 6-4 6-3 16-14 match.

2010s

2020s

See also
Davis Cup
Syria Fed Cup team

References

External links

Davis Cup teams
Davis Cup
Davis Cup